Odorrana hainanensis is a species of frogs in the family Ranidae that might be endemic to Hainan Island, China; there is one record from Guangxi. Prior to its description in 2001, it was confused with Odorrana andersonii.

Odorrana hainanensis is a very rare species inhabiting large to medium streams and the surrounding forests. It is threatened by habitat loss caused by agriculture, logging, and hydropower development.

Description
Males measure  and females  in snout–vent length.

References

hainanensis
Amphibians described in 2001
Frogs of China
Endemic fauna of Hainan
Taxonomy articles created by Polbot